Agapius may refer to:

Agapius, traditionally one of the companions of Aphrodisius
Agapius of Spain (died 259), Christian martyr, died at Citra
Agapius of Palestine (died 303/304), Christian martyr, beheaded along with many others under Great Persecution of Diocletian
Agapius of Edessa (died 304), Christian martyr and one of three sons of St Bassa
Agapius (died 306), a Christian martyr drowned at Caesarea
Agapius of Caesarea, Bishop of Caesarea (c. 303–c. 312), predecessor to Eusebius
Agapius (soldier) (died 315), Christian martyr and soldier, burned with Carterius and others in Armenia
Agapius of Novara (died 447), Bishop of Novara for over 30 years - see Roman Catholic Diocese of Novara
Agapius (Manichaean), 4th or 5th century Manichaean philosopher and possible disciple of Mani
Agapius of Alexandria, 5th century ancient physician from Alexandria
Agapius of Athens, 5th-6th century Neoplatonist philosopher from Athens
Agapius of Hierapolis (died after 942), Arab Christian bishop of Manbij (Hierapolis) and historian
Agapius of Galatista (1710–1752), saint and martyr

Masculine given names